, referred as Fūrin by fans, is a Japanese voice actress primarily for visual novels.

Voice roles
2003
Hajiome

2004
Reminiscence Blue
Raspberry
Pussy Cat
North Wind as Yukari Yanagi
Sister Sister at Kasuminokouji Sana

2005
Festa!! -Hyper Girls Pop- as Kotoko Kusakube
Pure×Cure
Happiness! Jun Watarase and Soprano
Otome wa Boku ni Koishiteru as Takako Itsukushima

2006
Yokobari Saboten as Ayane Nanatsuki
Hapokuri
Nanatsuiro Drops Sumomo Akihime
Aozora no Mieru Oka as Mikoto Tachibana

2007
Nutmeg as Hotori 
Katahane as Wakaba and Light Faure

2008
Sakura Strasse as Marie Rudel

2009
Mashiroiro Symphony as Amaha Yuiko
Hoshizora no Memoria -Wish upon a Shooting Star- as Minahoshi Asuho
Hoshizora no Memoria -Eternal Heart- as Minahoshi Asuho
Yoake Mae yori Ruriiro na -Moonlight Cradle- as Estel Freesia

2010
Iro ni Ide ni Keri Waga Koi wa as Kikyou Tenjo
Shukufuku no Campanella as Nina Lindberg
Rui wa Tomo wo Yobu -Full Voice-  as Wakutsu Tomo
Rui wa Tomo wo Yobu Fan Disc -Asu no Mukou ni Mieru Kaze- as Wakutsu Tomo

2011
Rui wa Tomo wo Yobu Drama CD -Nemurenu Mori no Ibara-hime- as Wakutsu Tomo

External links
Fūri Samoto at infoseek.co.jp 

Japanese voice actresses
Living people
Year of birth missing (living people)